Atuncolla District is one of fifteen districts of Puno Province in Peru.

Ethnic groups 
The people in the district are mainly indigenous citizens of Quechua descent. Quechua is the first language which the majority of the population (90.06%) learnt to speak in childhood. 9.23% of the residents speak Spanish as a first language. (2007 Peru Census).

See also 
 Hatunqucha
 Lake Umayo
 Sillustani

References